Chisenhale Gallery is a non-profit contemporary art gallery based in London's East End.

Background
The organisation focuses on a programme of commissioned exhibitions, events, performances and talks.

The gallery occupies the ground level of a 1930s veneer factory on Chisenhale Road situated in the London Borough of Tower Hamlets, near Victoria Park, housed in the same building are Chisenhale Art Place and Chisenhale Dance Space.

The gallery is one of Arts Council England's National Portfolio Organisations.

Exhibitions
Artists who have exhibited at Chisenhale Gallery include Rachel Whiteread, Cornelia Parker, Gillian Wearing, Sam Taylor Wood, Wolfgang Tillmans, Paul Noble, Yoko Terauchi, Pipilotti Rist, and Thomas Hirschhorn. In the past decade under the directorship of Polly Staple the gallery has produced solo commissions with a new generation of artists including Florian Hecker, Duncan Campbell, Melanie Gilligan, Hito Steyerl, Janice Kerbel, Josephine Pryde, James Richards, Linder, Lynette Yiadom-Boakye, Amalia Pica, Helen Marten, Ed Atkins,  Jordan Wolfson, Camille Henrot, Céline Condorelli, Ed Fornieles, Ahmet Ögüt,  Park McArthur, Maria Eichhorn,  Luke Willis Thompson, Hannah Black,  Banu Cennetoğlu, and Lawrence Abu Hamdan,

Networks

Plus Tate 
Plus Tate was launched in 2010 with an aim to share art collections and expertise with other UK galleries. The Chisenhale Gallery is one of 34 partners.

How to work together
How to work together was a partnership programme of contemporary art commissions and research based projects devised by Chisenhale Gallery, The Showroom and Studio Voltaire between 2013 and 2016. The project is supported by Arts Council England's Catalyst Arts grant scheme, Bloomberg, Cockayne Grants for the Arts and the Jerwood Charitable Foundation.

References

External links 
 Chisenhale Gallery's official website
 How to work together website

Contemporary art galleries in London
Art museums established in 1986